United States v. 11 1/4 Dozen Packages of Articles Labeled in Part Mrs. Moffat's Shoo-Fly Powders for Drunkenness, 40 F. Supp. 208, was a 1941 US federal court case heard in the United States District Court for the Western District of New York, alleging the misbranding of a putative cure for alcohol intoxication. The action's unusual name results, in part, from the customs of cases with in rem jurisdiction, and refers to 135 packages of the containers used to hold the powder. This case was one of the first actions taken by the United States Food and Drug Administration.

Background
Mrs. Moffat's Shoo-Fly Powders for Drunkenness, manufactured by M. F. Groves' Son & Co., was a product popular in the 19th century, alleged to be an effective antidote for drunkenness.  The powder was tartar emetic, antimony potassium tartrate, which induces vomiting. By 1939, the product was considered a Mickey Finn, and criminal convictions had been obtained for some sellers for selling unlabelled poisons.

In 1938, the United States Congress passed the Federal Food, Drug, and Cosmetic Act (FFDCA), which gave authority to the Food and Drug Administration to regulate the manufacture and sale of food, pharmaceuticals and cosmetics involved in interstate commerce.  Most of the provisions of that Act took effect in 1940.

Legal case and opinion

The FDA seized the packages following their shipment from the manufacturer in Philadelphia to Buffalo, New York, in November 1940. On November 27, the United States Attorney for the Western District of New York filed suit in district court under the FFDCA.

District Judge John Knight presided at trial.  During the trial, the manufacturer was allowed to intervene in the case, and, during the trial, argued that the product had been sold for over 60 years, and despite annual sales of over 50,000 packages, no complaints had allegedly been received.  The manufacturer's statements were stricken as hearsay.

A panel of five physicians testified to the toxicity and side-effects of tartar emetic, with the opinion summarizing their testimony in part:

The court ruled that the phrase "for Drunkenness" suggested that the powder was a cure or antidote for alcohol intoxication, with the judge concluding:

Another issue in the case was the question of whether the FFDCA, required an intent to "deceive and defraud"; Knight's ruling set a lasting precedent that such intent was not required to win condemnation under the Act.

The "11 1/4 dozen packages" were condemned and later destroyed.

Subsequent developments
The safety of the powders, argued in this case, has been further questioned, with at least one source wondering whether the rates of deaths attributed to liver failure and alcohol withdrawal during that era might have been due, instead, to the toxic effects of the product.

No antidote for inebriation was known to science until Ro15-4513 was developed (but not brought to market) in the 1980s.

The case name has been the target of humor, by sources such as Harper's Magazine in 2004 and the Virginia Law Review in both 1955 and 2010.

References

Notes

Citations

1941 in United States case law
United States commercial speech case law
Patent medicines
United States in rem cases
Alcohol abuse in the United States
Food and Drug Administration
Emetics